Jean Carrère (5 April 1930 – 27 May 2022) was a French rugby union player who played for Paris Université Club, Racing Club Vichy, RC Toulonnais, USA Perpignan, Étoile sportive catalane and the national team.

References

1930 births
2022 deaths
French rugby union players
French rugby union coaches
France international rugby union players
RC Toulonnais players
USA Perpignan players
Rugby union flankers
Sportspeople from Pyrénées-Orientales